Ahilya Bai Holkar (31 May 1725 – 13 August 1795) was the hereditary noble queen of the Maratha Empire, in early-modern India. She established Maheshwar (in Madhya Pradesh) as the seat of Holkar Dynasty.

After the demise of her husband Khande Rao Holkar and father-in-law Malhar Rao Holkar, Ahilya Bai herself undertook the affairs of Holkar dynasty. She defended the Malwa state against intruders and personally led armies into battle, with Tukoji Rao Holkar as her military commander.

Ahilya Bai was a great pioneer and builder of Hindu temples who constructed hundreds of temples and Dharmashalas throughout India. She is specially renowned for refurbishing & reconsecrating some of the most sacred sites of Hindu pilgrimage that had been desecrated & demolished in the previous century by the Mughal Emperor Aurangzeb.

Early life

Ahilya Bai was born into a Marathi Hindu family to Mankoji Shinde and Sushila Shinde in the Chaundi village (present-day Ahmednagar district) of Maharashtra, where her father, Mankoji Shinde, a scion of a respectable Dhangar family, served as the Patil. Although women did not go to school back then, Ahilya's father taught her to read and write.

According to a legend, she rose to prominence when Malhar Rao Holkar, a commander in the army of Maratha Peshwa Baji Rao I and ruler of Malwa, stopped in Chaundi on his way to Pune and saw the eight-year-old Ahilya at a temple service in the village. Impressed by her piety and character, Malhar married Ahilya to his son, Khande Rao Holkar on the Peshwas advice. She married Khande Rao in 1733. Ahilya accompanied Khande Rao on many campaigns. Throughout her married life, she was brought up by her mother in law Gautama Bai who is credited today for the values instilled in Ahilya. She trained her into administration, accounts, politics etc and eventually handed over her Khasgi Jagir in 1759.

In 1754, Khande Rao, alongside his father Malhar Rao Holkar, laid the siege of Kumher fort of Jat Raja Suraj Mal of Bharatpur on request of support from Imad-ul-Mulk and the Mughal emperor Ahmad Shah Bahadur's general Mir Bakhshi. Suraj Mal had sided with the Mughal emperor's rebellious wazir Safdar Jang. Khande Rao was inspecting his troops in an open palanquin during the battle when a cannonball fired from the Jat army hit him, leading to his death.
After the death of her husband,  Ahilya Bai was stopped by her father in law from committing sati. 
After demise of her husband she was trained in military affairs by Malhar Rao holkar.

Reign

Ascent 
After her husbands Khande Rao's death, Ahilya Bai had given up all desires of life and decided to perform Sati to accompany her husband at his funeral pyre. People requested her not to commit Sati, but she said her husband had pledged to accompany her lifelong, and now he has left midway. When she had made up her mind to perform Sati and was not relenting, it was finally her father-in-law Malhar Rao who made fervent emotional appeals to stop her. He said:   "Daughter, my son left me whom I raised with a hope that he would support me in my old age. Now, will you also leave me, an old man, alone to be drowned in the fathomless ocean? ... Will you also leave me without any support? Still, if you don't want to change your mind, let me die first."Malhar Rao Holkar died in 1766, 12 years after the death of his son Khande Rao. Malhar Rao's grandson and Khande Rao's only son Male Rao Holkar became the ruler of Indore in 1766, under Ahilya Bai's regency, but he too died within few months in April 1767. Ahilya Bai became the ruler of Indore after the death of her son with Khande Rao.

A letter to her from Malhar Rao in 1765 illustrates the trust he had in her ability when sending her on a military expedition to Gwalior with a huge artillery:
 "...proceed to Gwalior after crossing the Chambal. You may halt there for four or five days. You should keep your big artillery and arrange for its ammunition as much as possible... The big artillery should be kept at Gwalior and you should proceed further after making proper arrangements for  expenses for a month. On the march you should arrange for military posts being located for protection of the road."
This letter clearly shows that not only was Ahilya Bai militarily trained, she was also considered capable enough to run civil and military affairs. When Ahmad Shah Durrani invaded Punjab in 1765, Malhar Rao was busy fighting the Abdali-Rohilla army in Delhi. During the same time, Ahilya Bai captured the Gohad fort (near Gwalior). 

Already trained to be a ruler, Ahilya Bai petitioned Peshwa Madhav Rao I after Malhar Rao and her son's death to grant her the administration of the Holkar dynasty. Some in Malwa objected to her assumption of rule, but the Holkar faction of Maratha army sided with her. The Peshwa granted her permission on 11 December 1767, with subhedar Tukoji Rao Holkar (Malhar Rao's adopted son) as her military head. She proceeded to rule Malwa in the most enlightened manner, even reinstating a Brahmin who had previously opposed her. Ahilya Bai paid regular visits to her subjects, being always accessible to anyone needing her help.

Conflict with Dewan Gangadhar Rao

Following the death of Male Raao Holkar, Gangadhar Rao, Malhar Rao Holkar's dewan, believing Ahilyabai to be a weak powerless widow, tried to usurp royal authority for himself by requesting Ahilyabai to adopt him as her son & grant all administrative power to him but she promptly refused to do so. Gangadhar Rao then orchestrated a rebellion against her & instigated Raghunathrao, uncle of Peshwa Madhavrao, to attack the Holkar domain of Indore. On coming to know about the encampment of Raghunathrao's army at the banks of the river Shipra through her spies, Ahilyabai immediately despatched letters to compatriots of her late father-in-law, Mahadji Scindia & Damaji Rao Gaekwad, asking for assistance and assembled the Holkar army with the help of Tukoji. The Bhonsales of Nagpur sent their armies to assist her & Peshwa Madhavrao authorised Ahilyabai to take offensive action against Raghunathrao. Ahilyabai herself went to the battlefield with her female bodyguards to face Raghunathrao. Seeing Ahilyabai's courage, Raghunathrao was frightened & retreated back stating that he had just come to offer condolence to Ahilyabai for the death of Male Rao. Gangadhara Rao was kept under house-arrest before being reinstated back to his former position. The conflict between Ahilyabai Holkar and Dewan Gangadhar Rao had significant political and personal implications. Ahilyabai's victory helped her to establish her authority over the kingdom, but the conflict also strained her relationship with Gangadhar Rao, who was her trusted advisor and confidant.

Clashes with Rajputs
Ahilyabai defended her realms from Rajput raids in the aftermath of the Rajputs defeating the Maratha army led by Mahadji Scindia at the battle of Lalsot.

Among Ahilya Bai's accomplishments was the transformation of Indore from a small village to a prosperous and beautiful city; her own capital, however, was in the nearby Maheshwar, a town on the banks of Narmada River. She also commissioned several infrastructure projects in Malwa, sponsored festivals and gave donations for regular worship in many Hindu temples. Outside Malwa, she built numerous Hindu temples, Ghats, wells, tanks and rest-houses throughout the Indian subcontinent, stretching from the Himalayas to pilgrimage centres in southern India. The Bharatiya Sanskriti Kosh lists the sites she embellished as Kashi, Gaya, Somnath, Ayodhya, Mathura, Haridwar, Kanchi, Avanti, Dwarka, Badrinath Temple, Rameshwaram and Jagannath Puri. Ahilya Bai also supported the rise of merchants, farmers and cultivators to levels of affluence and did not consider that she had any legitimate claim to their wealth, be it through taxes or feudal right.

There are many stories of her care for her subjects. In one instance, when her minister refused to allow the adoption of a child unless he was suitably bribed, she is said to have sponsored the child herself and given him clothes and jewels as a part of the adoption ritual. 

Ahilya Bai could not settle the conflict peacefully in the case of the Bhils and Gonds, who unethically plundered her borders; but she granted them waste hilly lands and the right to a small duty on goods passing through their territories. Even in this case, according to Malcolm, she did give "considerate attention to their habits".

Ahilya Bai's capital at Maheshwar was the scene of literary, musical, artistic and industrial enterprise. She patronized the famous Marathi poet Moropant and the shahir Anantaphandi from Maharashtra, and also patronised the Sanskrit scholar, Khushali Ram. Craftsmen, sculptors and artists received salaries and honours at her capital and she even established a textile industry in Maheshwar.

Ahilyabai repealed a traditional law that had previously empowered the state to confiscate the property of childless widows. 

In 1780, following the death of her husband preceded by the death of their 16 year old son, Ahilyabai's daughter Muktabai committed sati.

Death

Ahilyabai died on 13 August 1795 at the age of 70. A woman of modern times, Ahilyabai's rule is remembered as a golden age in the history of Maratha Empire. Ahilyabai was succeeded by her commander-in-chief and nephew, Tukoji Rao Holkar, who soon abdicated the throne in favour of his son Kashi Rao Holkar in 1797.

Children 
She gave birth to a son Male Rao and daughter Muktabai in 1745 and 1748, respectively. Male Rao became mentally ill in later life  and died in 1767 due to his disease. Ahilya Bai married her daughter to Yashwant Rao, a brave but poor man, after he had succeeded in defeating dacoits.

Views about her

Collecting oral memories of her in the 1820s, Sir John Malcolm, the British official most directly concerned with the 'settlement' of central India, seems to have become deeply enamored of her.

John Keay called her 'The Philosopher Queen', a reference perhaps to the 'Philosopher king' Bhoj.

A commemorative stamp was issued in her honour on 25 August 1996 by the Republic of India.

As a tribute to the great ruler, Indore international airport has been named Devi Ahilyabai Holkar Airport. Similarly, Indore university has been renamed as Devi Ahilya Vishwavidyalaya.

Structures throughout India

The Holkar family was known for avoiding using public cash to meet their personal and family expenses. They possessed their personal funds, which they had accumulated through their private property. Ahilyabai inherited personal funds estimated at sixteen crores rupees at the time. Ahilyabai donated money from her personal resources to charity.

Ahilyabai funded the reconstruction of the Kashi Vishwanath Temple in Varanasi(Uttar Pradesh)1780 which had been destroyed in the past and subsequently converted into a mosque by Aurangzeb in 1669. Construction of 9 temples including those of  Shri Tarakeshwar, Shri Gangaji, Ahilya Dwarkeshwar, Gautameshwar; (re)construction of Ghats including Manikarnika Ghat, Dashashwamedh Ghat, Janana Ghat, Ahilya Ghat, Shitala Ghat; construction of Uttarkashi Dharmashala, Rameshwar Panchkoshi Dharmashala, Kapila Dhara Dharmashala & gardens

In popular culture

 Former Lok Sabha Speaker Sumitra Mahajan has written a book "Matoshree" based on the life of Ahilyadevi Holkar.
 A film titled Devi Ahilya Bai was produced in 2002 featuring Mallika Prasad as Devi Ahilya Bai, Shabana Azmi as Harkubai (Khanda Rani, Malhar Rao Holkar's wife) and also including Sadashiv Amrapurkar as Malhar Rao Holkar, Ahilyabai's father in law.
 A documentary for UGC-CEC channel VYAS was made by Educational Multimedia Research Centre, Indore about her life and times.
 In Thane City in Maharashtra, a children's park has been named as 'Ahilyadevi Holkar Udyan' after her. Also, a road has been named after her in the same city.
 The airport at Indore is named Devi Ahilya Bai Holkar Airport in her honor.
 There are two universities named Devi Ahilya Vishwa Vidyalaya in Indore, Madhya Pradesh, and Punyashlok Ahilyadevi Holkar Solapur University in Solapur, Maharashtra.
 In 2006, a statue of Ahilyabai Holkar was unveiled on the premises of the Parliament Library Building by Vice-President Bhairon Singh Shekhawat. 
 In the 1994 Hindi TV series The Great Maratha, Ahilyabai's character was portrayed by Mrinal Kulkarni.
 In 2016, a TV serial titled Punyashlok Ahilybai Holkar aired on Colors Marathi starring Urmila Kothare as Ahilybai.
 In 2021, a TV serial titled Punyashlok Ahilyabai aired on Sony. Aditi Jaltare played the role of a young Ahilyabai followed by Aetashaa Sansgiri who is currently playing an adult Ahilyabai.
 The State Highway 15 (West Bengal) has been renamed as Ahilyabai Holkar Road.

References

Further reading
 In Marathi

 List of Ahilyabai Holkar Books in Marathi - AhilyaStore
 Punyashlok Ahilya by R.W.Tikore-Kumthewale
 Ahilyabai by Hiralal Sharma
 Ahilyabai Charitra by Purshottam
 Ahilyabai Charitra by Mukund Vaman Barve
Dnyat Adnyat Ahilyabai Holakar by Vinaya Khadapekar
 Pal Samaaj on Samaaj
 ''Matoshree" by Sumitra Mahajan

External links
 
 Ahilyadevi Holkar: A Magnificent Ruler, Saintly Administrator
https://ahilyabaiholkar.in/

1725 births
1795 deaths
People from Maharashtra
Indian queens
Kings of Malwa
Indian women in war
Women in 18th-century warfare
History of Madhya Pradesh
People from Madhya Pradesh
People from Khargone
Indian female royalty
18th-century women rulers
Marathi people
People from Ahmednagar district
Maharajas of Indore
Indian queen consorts
Women of the Maratha Empire
Queen mothers
Holkar
18th-century Indian women
18th-century Indian people